The Pitts Samson was an aerobatic biplane designed by Curtis Pitts in 1948.

Design and development 
The Samson was designed for aerobatic pilot Jess Bristow.  It was a larger variant of the earlier Pitts Special, built using war surplus parts.  It had an open cockpit and was powered by a single Pratt & Whitney R-985 Wasp Junior radial engine.

Operational history 
In 1952, the sole Samson, registered N52137, suffered a mid-air collision and crash landed, being destroyed in the resulting fire.  Pilot Buddy Rogers was uninjured.

Replicas 
Wolf Aircraft built a replica of the Samson in 1985.  Like the original, the replica was powered by a 450 hp R-985 Wasp Junior.  This aircraft was also destroyed in a mid-air collision in 2005, killing pilot Bobby Younkin and his airshow partner Jimmy Franklin.

Wolf Aircraft built a second Samson replica in 2005 for the company's founder, Steve Wolf, who sold it to a German pilot shortly after it was completed.  The aircraft, referred to as "Samson II", is of a modified design, with the fuselage being a foot shorter than the original and featuring ailerons on the top wing.  The aircraft was eventually bought by American pilot Tim Just under the registration N985TJ, and was reportedly involved in an accident on May 20, 2018, in which it lost control on landing and came to rest inverted, though the pilot was uninjured.

B & R Aviation began construction of a Samson replica for Pip Borrman in 2000.  This replica was of a modernized design, featuring metal and carbon fiber construction, the airfoil of a Beechcraft Model 17 Staggerwing, and the control surfaces of a Pitts Model 11 "Super Stinker".  It was powered by a fuel injected R-985 Wasp Junior which drove a MT propeller.  The aircraft, registered VH-EAB, was completed in 2008.  At approximately 14:30 on February 25, 2009, Borrman's Samson suffered an engine failure and crashed while practicing for the following month's Australian International Airshow, destroying the aircraft and killing Borrman.

Specifications (Samson)

See also

References 

Pitts aircraft
1940s United States sport aircraft
Aerobatic aircraft
Biplanes
Single-engined tractor aircraft
Aircraft first flown in 1948
Conventional landing gear